Tajna Crne Kutije (The Best Of) is a double album that features the best tracks of Tram 11. It was released in 2003. The first disc features Tram 11's greatest hits and 3 new tracks(Veliki Odmor, Mi Smo Tu and Bomba), and the second disc features mostly rare and unreleased tracks or collaborations with other artists that we're not released as a part of their own albums before.

Track listing

Disc 1

Disc 2

Tram 11 albums
2003 greatest hits albums